The Hobie Wildcat is a Formula 18 developed by Hobie Cat Europe as a one-design within the Formula 18 rules. The class was recognised by the International Sailing Federation in November 2010. It is designed to replace the Hobie Tiger as a more up to date and competitive design within the Formula 18 fleet.

References

See also
 List of multihulls

Classes of World Sailing
Catamarans
Sailboat type designs by Hobie Cat Europe
Sailboat types built by Hobie Cat Europe